Jacinthe Larivière (born July 25, 1981) is a Canadian former pair skater. With Lenny Faustino, she is the 2001 Nebelhorn Trophy champion and 2003 Canadian national champion. They were coached by Lee Barkell in Barrie, Ontario.

Programs 
(with Faustino)

Results
(with Lenny Faustino)

References

External links
 

1981 births
Canadian female pair skaters
Olympic figure skaters of Canada
Figure skaters at the 2002 Winter Olympics
Living people
Figure skaters from Montreal